Dehak (also known as Dūhak) is a village in Shurab Rural District, in the Central District of Arsanjan County, Fars Province, Iran. At the 2006 census, its population was 324, in 78 families.

References 

Populated places in Arsanjan County